Saka Saka is a 2013 Philippine action film co-written and directed by Toto Natividad. The film stars Ejay Falcon and Joseph Marco. It was one of the entries in the 2013 Metro Manila Film Festival under the New Wave category.

Cast
 Ejay Falcon as Alex
 BJ Forbes as Young Alex
 Joseph Marco as Abner
 Nathaniel Britt as Young Abner
 Akiko Solon as Nadia
 Baron Geisler as Balneg
 Kathleen Hermosa as Alissa
 Perla Bautista as Minyang
 Toby Alejar as Gov. Lontilla
 Martin Imperial as Gov. Lontilla's Son
 Gold Aceron as Young Gov. Lontilla's Son
 Mon Confiado as Guido
 Rey Solo as Turo
 Troy De Guzman as Old Turo
 Richard Manabat as Gov. Fuentebella
 Jairus Aquino as Young Sakasaka
 Gigi Locsin as Mayor Miling Villena
 Teresita Gonzales as Carissa
 Gemma Masas as Kapanalig
 Dindo Gonzales as Spy
 Joseph Ison as Old Edring

Reception
Christine Denny of Philippine Entertainment Portal gave Saka Saka a positive review. She praised the clear portrayal of the characters played Ejay Falcon and Joseph Marco, as well as the clear view based on true events regarding political killings in the provinces. She also praised Falcon for performing his own stunts in his first action film, while noting that he needs more practice when it comes to physical fight scenes.

Awards

References

External links

2013 films
2013 action films
Filipino-language films
Philippine action films
Star Cinema films
Films directed by Toto Natividad